Franklin's Gardens (currently known for sponsorship purposes as cinch Stadium at Franklin's Gardens) is a purpose-built rugby stadium in Northampton, England.  It is the home stadium of Northampton Saints. The stadium holds 15,249 people. The four stands are: Carlsberg Stand; Cinch Stand; Church's Stand; and Barwell Stand. It is also a conference, meeting & events venue as well as the only Premiership Rugby ground with its own cenotaph, the setting for a ceremony every Remembrance Weekend.

History of Franklin's Gardens
The Gardens, originally known as Melbourne Gardens, were created by John Collier, and opened in 1864. After his death in 1885 they were bought by John Franklin, a successful hotelier, in 1886 who renamed them Franklin's Gardens the following year.

In 1888 the Gardens were sold for £17,000 to the Northampton Brewery Company who started making extensive improvements. New features included a running track, bicycle track, cricket ground, swimming pool, bear pit, a large ornamental lake, an improved monkey house and a larger zoological garden.

Franklin's Gardens was described as the "Champs Elysees of Northampton" and trams ran from the town centre every few minutes for a penny. Home matches began in Abbey fields, next door to Franklin's Gardens and it wasn't until the late 1880s when the Saints moved to Franklin's Gardens.

At the end of the 1896/97 season a new stand was built by Mr A Dunham's building company, 45 feet long and costing £45 5s. It was carpeted and reserved for members paying 10s 6d for season tickets.

On 9 October 1920, a two-page advertisement in the Independent appeared offering 15,000 shares in a new company, Franklins Gardens Sports and Pleasure Co Ltd. The company prospectus proposed to turn the site into a sports complex, allowing the Saints to play at the Gardens in return for a percentage of the gate.

During the Second World War Franklin's Gardens was used for livestock. However that didn't last long, as there was a new-look Franklin's Gardens in, with its £6,000 Member's stand.

The 1966/67 season kicked off with style with the opening of the Peter Haddon designed Gordon Sturtridge Pavilion, marked by a floodlit game between the Saints and an R E G Jeeps XV. The pavilion enhanced the Gardens’ reputation for being one of the finest rugby grounds in the country.

During the 1976/77 season the club acquired a four-acre training pitch on a 60-year lease at the back of the ground and in November 1977, the committee pulled off its biggest coup by buying Franklin's Gardens outright for £30,000.

During the early 1990s a raft of temporary stands increased the capacity up to 10,000. Then in 2001 the stadium underwent a complete re-build. The fans got their first look of the £6 million new look Franklin's Gardens on 8 September 2001.

The Tetley's and South stands were opened formally by Ian McGeechan with the horseshoe stadium completed in summer 2002 with the building of the Church's Stand, opened by five Saints legends. But there was more development to come in 2005 when an extension to the South Stand became a further piece to the Franklin's Gardens jigsaw.

The north stand was re-developed in the summer of 2015, this included the demolition of the old Sturtridge Pavilion and the construction of the new Barwell Stand, marking the end of the original re-build plans.

In September 2021, Saints announced a six-year naming rights deal with car purchasing company cinch. The deal would see the stadium renamed cinch Stadium at Franklin's Gardens.

Location 

Franklin's Gardens is  located in the St James district of Northampton, approximately one mile from the town centre

Stands

Carlsberg Stand

The Carlsberg Stand (formerly the Tetley's stand) holds 6,000 (est) people and has 19 executive boxes. The stand's capacity is split between the Gordon Terrace (named after former club secretary Jerry Gordon) and seating. Unlike premier league football stadiums, standing is allowed at rugby stadiums and the terracing was included as a specific part of the design. All of the people in the stand are under cover.

The Carlsberg Stand also includes the club's major conferencing facilities, including the Rodber Suite, Captains' Suite and Heroes' Bar. There is full wireless internet access throughout the stand. Facilities including all the bars and suites were refurbished to simulate the look and feel of the members' bar located in the Barwell Stand in 2016.

In November 2017, it was announced that through a continuation of the sponsorship from Carlsberg, the stand will be re-branded as 'The Carlsberg Stand', this rebrand was completed in July 2018.

The cinch Stand

In 2005 the South Stand was doubled in size raising the Gardens capacity from 12,100 to 13,591. The redevelopment involved extending the South Stand over the lake in the village area of the ground to make room for additional seating, seven new boxes, a premium members' club, as well another bar and extra toilet facilities. The South stand extension was finished in the 2005/2006 season. At the start of the 10/11 season it was announced that the South stand will be renamed the Burrda Stand after the club's new kit suppliers. The stand was renamed in 2016 to become the Elite Insurance Stand, but this ended in 2018. The stand has been known as the cinch Stand since 26 December 2020.

The Church's Stand

The Church's Stand is the 'third' all seater stand. It was developed and completed the horseshoe in the summer of 2002. It was opened by five club legends, former captains – Ron Jacobs, Don White, Gary Pearce, David Powell and Vince Cannon in November 2002.

The stand replaced the old Members' Stand which had lasted since the 1920s. It contains both the home and away dressing rooms, TV camera gantry, press bench, press room and a cinema for Saint's players (this was a bar until the Barwell Stand development).

The Barwell Stand
This is to the North of the ground and is the newest stand (built in 2015) which replaced The Sturtridge Pavilion, completing the redevelopment of Franklin's Gardens. This stand takes the name of the Barwell family, who were influential in making Northampton Saints one of English rugby's leading clubs at the turn of the professional era in the mid 1990s. This stand houses the members' bar, corporate facilities, control room, the Sturtridge Suite and approximately 2,000 seats. It also houses a war memorial to former Saints players who died in the 1st and 2nd World Wars. This stand was officially opened by Keith Barwell on 14 February 2016.

The Sturtridge Pavilion 
The 1966/67 season kicked off with style with the opening of the Peter Haddon designed Gordon Sturtridge Pavilion, marked by a floodlit game between the Saints and an R E G Jeeps XV. The pavilion enhanced the Gardens’ reputation for being one of the finest rugby grounds in the country.

The Pavilion was earmarked for demolition and redevelopment when the original rebuild was designed, however, due to time and money, the rebuild didn't happen until 2015.

The future

Future Development
Further development on the existing ground would be compromised by the Beacon Bingo hall which sits in close proximity to the Barwell Stand. The Church's Stand also is compromised by backing onto the site boundary. Further opportunity could involve expanding the South and/or Tetley's Stand's.

Northampton Saints explored playing one fixture a season at the 30,000 capacity MK Dons stadium in Milton Keynes, although in 2017 it was announced that this would be put on hold for the foreseeable future.

Other uses

Anglo-Welsh Cup
The second LV= Cup final was played at the Gardens, seeing Gloucester beat Newcastle 34–7.

Final

Touch judges:
Wayne Barnes (England)
Paul Dix (England)

Churchill Cup 2011
On 4 June the Churchill Cup was opened with a double header of fixtures as Canada defeated Italy 'A' before eventual winners 
England Saxons breezed past the USA.

See also
 Northampton
 Northampton Saints
 List of rugby union stadiums by capacity
 List of English rugby league stadia by capacity
 List of European stadia by capacity
 Churchill Cup
 LV= CupAnglo-Welsh Cup

References

Northampton Saints
Rugby union stadiums in England
Sports venues in Northampton
Sports venues completed in 1880